JoJo & Gran Gran is a British children's animated television series based on the semi-autobiographical picture book Jo-Jo and Gran-Gran, All in a Week by Laura Henry-Allain MBE. It is the first animated series to centre on a Black British family. It first premiered on 16 March 2020 and airs on weekdays on CBeebies.

Premise
JoJo is an inquisitive and cheerful 4-and-a-half-year-old girl who lives in London. Her loving Gran Gran looks after her while her parents work and teaches her about the many wonders of life and the world, such as cookery, friendship and her Saint Lucian heritage.

The series also features live-action interviews with real children, which accompany the animated segments, and features the children discussing the topic of the episode and how it relates to their lives and families. Usually, this will then lead to them performing a related activity, such as cooking a particular dish or painting.

Cast
 Taiya and Tyiana Samuel as JoJo
 Cathy Tyson as Gran Gran
 Llewella Gideon as Great Gran Gran
 Ashley Joseph as Jared
 Teresa Gallagher as Cynthia

Production
There are 44 episodes per series divided into four seasonal blocks. More than 100 people worked on the production; Tom Cousins is the series' producer and Tony Reed its executive producer. Leo Espinosa designed the characters. BBC Children's In-House Productions announced in 2020 a double season order for a second and third series, set to begin airing in 2022. In the United States, the series was released on the Noggin streaming app on 14 June 2021.

The series is based on Laura Henry-Allain's book. The main characters are based on herself and her Saint Lucian-born grandmother, Marie-Helena. The High Commission of Saint Lucia and the Saint Lucia tourism authority were consulted for the series.

Episodes

Series One

Spring

Summer

Autumn

Winter

Series Two

Spring

Awards and nominations

References

External links

2020 animated television series debuts
2020 British television series debuts
2020s British children's television series
2020s preschool education television series
Animated preschool education television series
Animated television series about children
BBC children's television shows
Black British cartoons
British children's animated television shows
British preschool education television series
British television series with live action and animation
British television shows based on children's books
CBeebies
Television series by BBC Studios
Television shows set in London
English-language television shows